The former Catholic diocese of Narbonne existed from early Christian times until the French Revolution. It was an archdiocese, with its see at Narbonne, from the year 445, and its influence ran over much of south-western France and into Catalonia.

During the French Revolution, under the Civil Constitution of the Clergy, the diocese of Narbonne was combined with the dioceses of Carcassonne, Alet, Saint-Papoul and Mirepoix into the new Diocese of the Aude, with its seat at Narbonne.  It included 565 parishes.  It was a part of the Métropole du Sud, which included ten départements.

The territory of the former diocese of Narbonne was merged under the Concordat of 1801 into the diocese of Carcassonne.  After the Restoration of the Bourbons following Napoleon's defeat at Waterloo, an attempt was made to re-establish the see was defeated in the French Parliament (1817).

After nearly a century,  a new metropolitan see was created for the Languedoc region, with the elevation of the bishopric of Montpellier to the rank of Metropolitan Archbishop on 8 December 2002.  The diocese of Carcassonne was transferred from the metropolitanate of Toulouse to that of Montpellier, and on 14 June 2006 the name of the diocese of Carcassonne was changed to the Diocese of Carcassonne and Narbonne.  Toulouse no longer carries the title Toulouse-Narbonne.

Bishops and archbishops

To 1000

 Saint Paul (c. 251)
 Saint Etienne (third century)
 Gavidius (359)
 Hilarius (417–422)
 Rusticus  (427, 461, c. 441–445)
 Hermes (462) 
 Caprarius (506)
 Aquilinus (560)
 Athaloc (c. 589)
 Migetius (Migecio) (c. 589–597)
 Sergius (c. 610)
 Selva (Sclua) (c. 633–638)
 Argebaud (c. 672)
 Sunifred (c. 683–688)
 Aribertus (c. 768)
 Daniel (c. 769–c. 798)
 Nebridius (Nefridius) (c. 790–822 or c. 799–c. 825)
 Bartholomeus (c. 827–840, or c. 822–844)
 Berarius (c. 842–c. 850)
 Fredoldus (c. 855–872)
 Sigebaud (873–885)
 Theodard (Teodard) (885–893)
 Arnustus (893–912)
 Gerard (912)
 Agio (912–924)
 Aimery (926–977)
 Ermengaud (Ermengol) (977–1017/1019)

1000–1300

 Guifred de Cerdagne (6 October 1019 – 1079)
  (1079–1085)
 Dalmatius (Dalmace) (elected September 1081 – 1097)
 Bertrand de Montredon (1097–1106)
 Richard de Millau (Milhau) (1106–1121)
 Arnaud de Lévezou (1121–1149) (bishop of Béziers)
 Pierre d'Anduze (1150–1156)
 Berenger of Narbonne (1156–1162), son of viscount Aimery I of Narbonne
 Pons D'Arce (1162–1181)
 Bernard Gaucelin (1182–1191) (bishop of Béziers, 1167–1182, and Administrator of Béziers, 1182–1184)
 Berengar of Barcelona (1191–1212); son of Raimund Berengar IV
 Arnaldus Amalric, O.Cist. (or Arnaud Amaury) (1212–1225)
 Pierre Amiel (Petrus Amelii) (1226–1245)
 Guillaume de Broue (1245–1257)
 Jacques (1257–1259)
 Guy de Foulques (1259–1261) (Bishop of Le Puy (1257–1259), later Pope Clement IV)
 Maurinus (1262–1272) 
 Pierre de Montbrun (1272–1286)
 Gilles I Aycelin de Montaigu (1287–1311)

1300–1500

 Bernard de Fargis (1311–1341)
 Gausbert du Val (1341–1346) (Cardinal)
 Pierre de La Jugie (1347–1375)
 Jean Roger (1375–1391)
 François de Conzié (1391–1432)
 Francesco Condulmer (1433–1436) (Cardinal)
 Jean D'Harcourt (1436–1451) (then Patriarch of Alexandria, 1451–?)
 Louis D'Harcourt (1451–1460)
 Antoine du Bec-Crespin (1460–1472)
 Renaud de Bourbon (1473–1482)
 Georges d'Amboise (1482–1484)
 François Ilallé (1484–1491)
 Georges d'Amboise, second time, (1492–1494) 
 Pierre D'Abzac (1494–1502)

after 1500

 François-Guillaume de Castelnau (1502–1507)
  Cardinal Guillaume Briçonnet (1507–1514)
  Cardinal Giulio de Medici (1515–1523) (later Pope Clement VII)
 John, Cardinal of Lorraine (1524–1550) 
 Ippolito II d'Este, Cardinal of Ferrara (1550–1551)
 Francesco Pisani (1551–1563) (Cardinal)
 Cardinal Ippolito II. d'Este (1563–1572)
 Simon Vigor (1572–1575)
  Cardinal François de Joyeuse (1581–1588)
 Raymond Cavalésy, O.P. (1588–1594)
 Louis de Vervins, O.P. (1600–1628)
 Claude de Rebé (1628–1659)
 François Fouquet (1659–1673)
 Pierre de Bonzi (1673–1703) (also archbishop of Toulouse)
 Charles Legoux de La Berchère (1711–1715)
 René-François de Beauvau du Rivau (1726–1738)
 Jean-Louis de Berton de Crillon (1739–1751)
 Charles-Antoine de La Roche-Aimon (1752–1762)
 Arthur Richard de Dillon (1763–1790) (1806)
 Guillaume Besaucèle (1791–4 February 1801)  (Constitutional Bishop of Aude)

See also
Catholic Church in France
List of Catholic dioceses in France

Notes

Bibliography

Reference works
 pp. 582–584. (Use with caution; obsolete)
  (in Latin) pp. 356.
 (in Latin) p. 199.
 p. 253.
 pp. 252.
 pp. 280.
 p. 301.

Studies
 [Archbishops of Narbonne].
 second edition (in French)  

Narbonne

445 establishments
5th-century establishments in sub-Roman Gaul
1801 disestablishments in France
History of Narbonne